is the railway station in Ōmura, Nagasaki Prefecture, Japan. It is operated by JR Kyushu and is on the Ōmura Line.

Lines
Besides the local services on the line, the Rapid Seaside Liner also stops at the station.

Station layout 
The station consists of two staggered side platforms serving two tracks. From the forecourt, a flight of steps leads up to the station building, a modern steel-frame structure which houses a staffed ticket window and a waiting room. Access to the opposite side platform is by means of a level crossing with steps at both ends.

Management of the station has been outsourced to the JR Kyushu Tetsudou Eigyou Co., a wholly owned subsidiary of JR Kyushu specialising in station services. It staffs the ticket window which is equipped with a POS machine but does not have a Midori no Madoguchi facility.

Adjacent stations

History
Japanese Government Railways (JGR) opened the station on 25 May 1922 as an additional station  on what was then the Nagasaki Main Line. With the privatization of Japanese National Railways (JNR), the successor of JGR, on 1 April 1987, control of the station passed to JR Kyushu.

Passenger statistics
In fiscal 2016, the station was used by an average of 1,254 passengers daily (boarding passengers only), and it ranked 137th  among the busiest stations of JR Kyushu.

Environs
National Route 34
National Route 444
Ōmura City Takematsu Branch
Shin-Ōmura Station (Kyushu Shinkansen Nagasaki/Nishi-Kyushu Route, in plan)

See also
 List of railway stations in Japan

References

External links
Takematsu Station (JR Kyushu)

Railway stations in Nagasaki Prefecture
Railway stations in Japan opened in 1922
Ōmura Line